Sung Yong Kim (born 1960) is an American diplomat of Korean descent serving as the United States Special Representative for North Korea Policy since 2021, and previously from 2014 to 2016. He has also served as the acting Assistant Secretary of State for East Asian and Pacific Affairs from January to June 2021.

In 2008, Kim was appointed by President George W. Bush as the U.S. Special Envoy for the Six-party talks. He later served in the Obama and Trump administrations as the Ambassador to South Korea from 2011 to 2014 and as the Ambassador to the Philippines from 2016 to 2020.  In 2020, Kim was appointed by President Donald Trump as Ambassador to Indonesia.

Early life and education 
Sung Kim was born in Seoul, South Korea, in 1960 to a South Korean diplomat and moved to the United States in 1973 following his father's posting in Tokyo. Kim grew up in Los Angeles and is a graduate of University of Pennsylvania (BA, 1982), Loyola Law School of the Loyola Marymount University (JD, 1985), and the London School of Economics (LL.M). He also holds an honorary degree from the Catholic University of Korea.

Professional career 
Before joining the United States Foreign Service at the State Department, Kim worked as public prosecutor at the Los Angeles County District Attorney's office.

He then worked as Staff Assistant in the Bureau of East Asian and Pacific Affairs in Washington, D.C. Kim was then assigned to United States Embassy in Seoul and worked as the Chief of Political Military Affairs. He then served as a Political Officer in Tokyo, Japan. His other assignments were to Kuala Lumpur and Hong Kong. Back in Washington, he was appointed Director of the Office of Korean Affairs and served in the position from August 2006 to July 2008. On July 31, 2008, he was appointed Special Envoy for the Six-Party talks and accorded the rank of an ambassador after confirmation of nomination by the U.S. Senate.

United States Ambassadorship

Ambassador to South Korea 
On June 24, 2011, President Obama nominated Kim to be the U.S. Ambassador to the Republic of Korea. However, Kim's nomination stalled after U.S. Senator Jon Kyl placed a hold on Kim's nomination over concerns not with Kim but with U.S. policy toward North Korea.
On October 13, 2011, Kyl lifted his hold on Kim's nomination and the Senate confirmed Kim by unanimous consent.

Kim completed his assignment to South Korea in late October 2014 and returned to the United States, where he was expected to continue to work on diplomacy involving East Asia. Mark Lippert was sworn in to succeed Kim as ambassador on October 24, 2014, in Washington, D.C.

In May 2014, near the end of his tenure, Kim was honored by the Asia Society for his service in Korea. Jonathan Karp, executive director of Asia Society, said Kim has done a lot to advance relations between the U.S. and Korea as a representative of the Obama administration. He was also named an honorary citizen of Seoul by Seoul Mayor Park Won-soon who said to Kim "Time flies so quickly. I must say I'm sad you have to return to your country... Even after you leave Korea for your next post, I ask of you that, as an honorary citizen of Seoul, you continue to have special interests in and affection for the city of Seoul and for Korea." In response, Kim said "It is after all my city of birth and the place I have always considered to be my second home."

Ambassador to the Philippines 

On May 19, 2016, U.S. President Obama nominated Kim to replace Philip Goldberg as the U.S. Ambassador to the Philippines. He was confirmed by the U.S. Senate on September 28, 2016, and was sworn in by Secretary of State John Kerry at the Department of State on Thursday, November 3, 2016. Kim arrived in Manila on December 3, a month after he was sworn in, and presented his credentials to Philippine President Rodrigo Duterte on December 6.

Kim, while Ambassador to the Philippines, led a delegation of American diplomats to hold talks with North Korean officials in Panmunjom in late May 2018. These talks were in regards to the upcoming summit between President Donald Trump and Kim Jong-un.

Ambassador to Indonesia 
On July 10, 2019, the White House announced that he would be appointed to be Ambassador to Indonesia. On August 6, 2020, his nomination was confirmed by voice vote. He was appointed on August 31, 2020 and assumed office in October 2020.

U.S. special envoy for North Korea 
President Joe Biden announced on May 21, 2021, that he would serve as the U.S. special envoy for North Korea.

Foreign honors 
:
 Grand Cross (Datu) of the Order of Sikatuna (GrCS) (8 September 2020)

Personal life 
Kim is married to Jae Eun Chung, with whom he has two daughters. He speaks Korean and Japanese.

See also 
North Korea–United States relations
Philippines–United States relations
Division of Korea
Korean War

References

External links 

|-

|-

|-

|-

|-

1960 births
Living people
21st-century American diplomats
Alumni of the London School of Economics
Ambassadors of the United States to Indonesia
Ambassadors of the United States to the Philippines
Ambassadors of the United States to South Korea
American prosecutors
George W. Bush administration personnel
Loyola Law School alumni
Obama administration personnel
People from Seoul
Lawyers from Los Angeles
South Korean emigrants to the United States
United States Department of State officials
University of Pennsylvania alumni
United States Special Envoys
United States Foreign Service personnel